Gábor Rajnay (born Gábor Rezső Árpád György Uros Imre Joanovics; 11 May 1895 – 10 July 1961) was a Hungarian film actor.

Selected filmography
 The Officer's Swordknot (1915)
 Faun (1918)
 Number 111 (1919)
 Yamata (1919)
 Ave Caesar! (1919)
 Man of Gold (1919)
 Emmy (1934)
 Romance of Ida (1934)
 Harvest (1936)
 Rézi Friday (1938)
Number 111 (1938)
 Young Noszty and Mary Toth (1938)
 Annamária (1942)
 Dr. Kovács István (1942)
 Janika (1949)
 Különös házasság (1951)
 Déryné (1951)
 Young Hearts (1953)
 Rokonok (1954)
 Liliomfi (1956)
 Before Midnight (1957)

External links

1895 births
1961 deaths
People from Arad, Romania
Hungarian male film actors
Hungarian male silent film actors
20th-century Hungarian male actors